The 1987–88 Michigan Wolverines men's basketball team represented the University of Michigan in intercollegiate college basketball during the 1987–88 season. The team played its home games in the Crisler Arena in Ann Arbor, Michigan, and was a member of the Big Ten Conference.  Under the direction of head coach Bill Frieder, the team finished second in the Big Ten Conference.  The team earned the number three seed in the 1988 NCAA Division I men's basketball tournament where it advanced two rounds before losing. The team was ranked all seventeen weeks of the season in the Associated Press Top Twenty Poll where it began the season at number nine, ended at number ten and peaked at number seven. and it also ended the season ranked tenth in the final UPI Coaches' Poll.

The team was the national statistical champion in team field goal percentage (54.6%, 1198 of 2196). The team established the current Big Ten Conference records for team single-game assists by twice totaling 37 (vs.  December 7, 1987, and vs.  December 12, 1987) as well as the current team assist record for conference games with 36 (vs. Iowa February 3, 1988).  The team also established Big Ten team records for single-season field goals made (1198), and single-season assists (694, 1987–88) that it would surpass the following season.  It also set the single-game (conference games only) three-point field goal percentage record that would only last one night (.875, 7 of 8, vs. Iowa February 3, 1988).

Glen Rice was the conference scoring champion with a 22.9 points per game average in conference games, while Gary Grant led the conference in both steals and assists with 2.72 and 6.5 averages, respectively in conference games. Grant served as team captain and shared team MVP with Rice.  Grant earned consensus All-American recognition.

The team set a new school record by totaling 2973 points over the course of the season, surpassing the record of 2821 set the prior year.  The record would be rebroken the following season.  Loy Vaught also set the Michigan single field goal percentage record at 62.18% which he would break the following season.  For the fourth of five consecutive seasons, the team set the school record for single-season field goal percentage on with a 54.6% (1198-for-2196) performance. Grant set the individual single-season three-point field goal percentage record of 48.53%, but it was eclipsed the following season by Glen Rice.  Also against Iowa on February 3, the team set the current three-point field goal single game percentage record by making 7 of its eight attempts, surpassing the December 6, 1986, record of 75%. Gary Grant's established the current school record when his single-season total of 234 assists surpassed his own school record total of 185 that he set two years earlier. His 731 career assists also established the current school record, surpassing Antoine Joubert's 539 set the prior season.  He also surpassed Dave Baxter's school single season average set in 1978 of 6.59 with the current record of 6.88 assists per game and Eric Turner's 1984 career average of 5.00 per game with a 5.67 average that was surpassed in 1990 by Rumeal Robinson. For the second of three consecutive seasons, the team set the school single-season total assist record with a total of 694, surpassing the prior total of 652. Grant's current school record total 14 assists in a game on December 7, 1987, against  and he repeated the feat on December 19 against . This surpassed Mark Bodnar and Antoine Joubert, who had each posted 13 assists in a game previously.  Grant's career steals total of 300 and average of 2.33 surpassed Thad Garner's 1982 statistics and remain school records.   Gary Grant career total of 4231 minutes surpassed Joubert's school record total of 3960 set the prior year. Louis Bullock would break the record in 1999. Gary Grant ended his career with 129 games played and 128 games started, which surpassed Joubert's 1987 school records of 127 games and  115 starts.  Glen Rice and Louis Bullock would surpass these records for games and starts in 1989 and 1999, respectively.

In the 64-team NCAA Division I men's basketball tournament, number three seeded Michigan advanced two rounds by defeating the fourteen-seeded Boise State Broncos 63–58 and the six-seeded Florida Gators 108–85. In the third round the team was defeated by two-seeded North Carolina 78–69.

Rankings

Team players drafted into the NBA
Six players from this team were selected in the NBA draft.

See also
 NCAA Men's Division I tournament bids by school
 NCAA Men's Division I tournament bids by school and conference
 NCAA Division I men's basketball tournament all-time team records

References

Michigan
Michigan
Michigan Wolverines men's basketball seasons
Michigan Wolve
Michigan Wolve